Voss or VOSS may refer to:

Arts, entertainment, and media
 Voss (novel), a novel by Patrick White
Voss (opera), an opera by Richard Meale based on the novel
 Voss Literary Prize, an annual Australian award
 "Voss", a 2018 song by XXXTentacion featuring Sauce Walka and Carnage from Bad Vibes Forever

Businesses and organizations
 Voss (water), a Norwegian bottled water brand
 VOSS Solutions, a British software company

People
 Voss (name), a list of people named Voss

Places
 Voss, a municipality in Vestland, Norway
 Voss or Vossevangen, a village in Voss Municipality, Vestland, Norway
 Voss Airport, Bømoen, a general aviation airport in Vestland, Norway
 Voss Church
 Voss Folk High School
 Voss Station
 Voss, North Dakota, an unincorporated community in Walsh County, North Dakota, United States
 Voss, Texas, an unincorporated community in Coleman County, Texas, United States
 Voss Creek, a stream in Franklin County, Missouri, United States
 Voßstraße or Voss Strasse (Voss Street), a street in Berlin, Germany

Transportation
 Voss Line, a Norwegian railway
 Changan VOSS, a Chinese concept compact MPV

Other uses
 23473 Voss, a main belt asteroid